Shire of Flinders may refer to one of two local government areas in Australia, each named after Captain Matthew Flinders:

 The current Shire of Flinders (Queensland)
 The former Shire of Flinders (Victoria)